Peter Warner Bullock (6 January 1925 – 16 February 1997) was an English cricketer who played first-class cricket for Assam in India from 1948 to 1952.

After World War II, Peter Bullock worked as a tea planter on the Kellyden Tea Estate in northern Assam. In cricket he was an opening or number three batsman and an opening bowler. He played in Assam’s first first-class match, when they played United Provinces in the 1948-49 Ranji Trophy. He scored 78 out of 153 in the first innings and took three wickets. He captained Assam to their first victory in first-class cricket, when they defeated Orissa in 1951-52; he top-scored in each innings with 31 and 148, and took 7 for 70 and 3 for 29 (match figures of 70.1–27–99–10).

References

External links
 
 

1925 births
1997 deaths
English cricketers
People from Harringay
Assam cricketers